Weberbauerocereus longicomus is a species of Weberbauerocereus from Peru.

References

External links
 
 

longicomus
Flora of Peru